Albert William Stokes (26 January 1933 – 1 May 2014) was an English professional footballer who played as a forward.

After previously playing for several non-League clubs, Stokes played 27 matches between 1954 and 1959 in the lower divisions of the Football League for Grimsby Town, Scunthorpe & Lindsey United (where he was a member of their 1957–1958 promotion winning squad) and Southport scoring a total of 7 goals. Thereafter his playing career continued with clubs at the non-league level.

References

External Links
Albert Stokes Football League A–Z Player's Transfer Database
Albert Stokes player profile Nuts and Bolts Archive: History of Ashford Town

1933 births
2014 deaths
People from Darnall
Footballers from Sheffield
English footballers
Association football forwards
Rotherham United F.C. players
Frickley Athletic F.C. players
Guildford City F.C. players
Hampton Sports F.C. players
Grimsby Town F.C. players
Scunthorpe United F.C. players
Southport F.C. players
Chelmsford City F.C. players
Ebbsfleet United F.C. players
Ashford United F.C. players
Loughborough F.C. players
Spalding United F.C. players
English Football League players